Devondrick Walker (born July 11, 1992) is an American professional basketball player for the Rockingham Flames of the NBL1 West. He played three years of college basketball for Texas A&M–Commerce before spending the first four seasons of his professional career in the NBA Development League. He later played in Italy, France, Australia, New Zealand and Latvia.

High school career
Walker attended South Garland High School in Garland, Texas, where he was a three-year letterwinner. As a senior in 2009–10, he averaged 10 points, four assists and four steals per game, which earned him all-district honors.

College career
Coming out of high school, Walker had no scholarship offers. Instead, he secured a last-second offer through a connection his high school assistant coach had. In May 2010, Walker signed a letter of intent to play basketball for Northwestern Oklahoma State University in the 2010–11 season. Walker played for former four-year Ranger basketball player and assistant coach at South Garland High School, Dominique Parker. He rarely played, however, and after one season transferred to Texas A&M University–Commerce, a little known Division-II school outside of Dallas. It was there that Walker found someone who believed in him—head coach Sam Walker. Devondrick said in January 2017, "I had an amazing head coach (Sam Walker). He forced me to defend when I didn't want to, forced me to rebound when I didn't want to."

As a sophomore in 2011–12, Walker saw action in all 27 games with 21 starts, and averaged 28.1 minutes, 8.9 points, 3.9 rebounds, 1.7 assists and 1.0 steals per game. He ranked 10th in the Lone Star Conference in free throw percentage (76.9) and was named the Lone Star Conference Offensive Player of the Week on February 27, 2012. He scored in double digits in 11 contests, including a career-best 24 points in the regular season finale against Angelo State on February 25, 2012.

As a junior in 2012–13, Walker appeared in all 29 games for the Lions with 14 starts. He averaged 9.5 points, 3.2 rebounds, 1.3 assists and 0.9 steals in 24.7 minutes per game. He shot 41.5 percent from the floor, including 41.9 percent from three-point range, while hitting 82.3 percent of his free throws, ranking second in the Lone Star Conference. He posted 13 double figure point totals on the year, highlighted by his 20-point performance against Southern Arkansas on November 26, 2012.

As a senior in 2013–14, Walker was a second-team all-Lone Star Conference selection, his first such honor. He finished the season ranked in the top 10 in the league with 13.6 points per game and led the LSC with a 91.3-percent mark from the foul stripe. He also was named to the academic all-LSC team for the second time in his career, graduating in May. On June 5, 2014, he was named the recipient of the 2013–14 Lone Star Conference Scholar-Athlete Award for A&M-Commerce.

Professional career

NBA D-League/G League (2014–2018)

2014–15 season
Upon graduating from college, Walker had no contract offers, and as a result, he thought his playing days had come to a close. However, after attending open tryouts with the Austin Spurs, Texas Legends and Rio Grande Valley Vipers of the NBA Development League, the Spurs added him to their training camp roster in early November 2014. In 2014–15, Walker helped Austin reach the Western Conference Finals of the 2015 NBA D-League Playoffs. In 37 games as a rookie, he averaged 3.0 points and 1.5 rebounds per game.

2015–16 season
On October 30, 2015, Walker was reacquired by the Austin Spurs. However, on November 11, 2015, he was waived by the Spurs prior to the start of the 2015–16 D-League regular season. On January 18, 2016, Walker was acquired by the Westchester Knicks. He remained with Westchester for the rest of the 2015–16 season, and in 25 regular-season games, Walker averaged 4.8 points and 2.2 rebounds per game.

2016–17 season
On October 31, 2016, Walker was reacquired by the Westchester Knicks. On December 14, 2016, he was traded to the Delaware 87ers in exchange for Von Wafer. Walker was averaging 10 points per game with Westchester and went on to average 15 points per game in January with Delaware. At the D-League Showcase, he scored 46 points over two games on 15-of-18 from the field, including 12-of-12 from 3-point range. Five of his six 20-point games with Delaware came after December, including a career-high 24 points in a 131–125 loss to the Maine Red Claws on February 4. Walker also tallied at least 17 points in 12 games, with 10 of those performances coming after December. Having demonstrated the most significant improvement during the 2016–17 NBA D-League season, Walker was named the NBA D-League Most Improved Player. In his third season in the NBA D-League, Walker appeared in 48 games (38 with Delaware, 10 with Westchester), averaging 12.0 points, 2.8 rebounds and 1.3 assists.

2017–18 season
After playing for the Utah Jazz during the 2017 NBA Summer League, Walker moved to Australia to play for the Perth Wildcats in the 2017–18 NBL season. However, after suffering a fracture in his left foot during preseason, Walker was replaced in the squad by J. P. Tokoto.

Walker returned to the Delaware 87ers in March 2018, but he did not play for the 87ers to finish the 2017–18 NBA G League season. He then played for the Philadelphia 76ers during the 2018 NBA Summer League.

Europe (2018–2020)
On July 31, 2018, Walker signed a one-year deal with Italian team Pallacanestro Trieste for the 2018–19 LBA season. He left them after appearing in four games. On January 9, 2019, he signed with New Basket Brindisi for the rest of the LBA season. In seven games for Brindisi, he averaged 11.4 points and 3.0 rebounds per game.

On December 12, 2019, Walker signed with French team Chorale Roanne Basket of the LNB Pro A. He parted ways with Chorale Roanne on January 13, 2020. He appeared in four games for Roanne, averaging 9.3 points in 23 minutes per game.

Return to Australia (2020)
On January 14, 2020, Walker signed with the South East Melbourne Phoenix for the rest of the 2019–20 NBL season, returning to Australia for a second stint. In eight games, he averaged 7.38 points and 2.25 rebounds per game.

New Zealand (2021)
On March 9, 2021, Walker signed with the Hawke's Bay Hawks for the 2021 New Zealand NBL season. He averaged 21 points, 5 rebounds and 3 assists per game.

Latvia (2021–2022)
On August 22, 2021, Walker signed with VEF Rīga of the Latvian–Estonian Basketball League. He parted ways with Rīga on January 24, 2022.

Return to Australia (2022–present)

On March 29, 2022, Walker signed with the Rockingham Flames of the NBL1 West for the 2022 season. He helped the Flames finish the regular season in second place with an 18–4 record and helped guide them to the NBL1 West Grand Final, where they defeated the Geraldton Buccaneers 91–79 to win the championship. Walker was named Grand Final MVP for his game-high 26 points. For the season, he was named the NBL1 West MVP alongside All-NBL1 West First Team and the league's scoring title. In 24 games, he averaged 26.96 points, 5.63 rebounds, 3.71 assists and 1.92 steals per game. The team went on to win the NBL1 national championship without him.

On September 5, 2022, Walker signed with the Brisbane Bullets for the 2022–23 NBL season. He was released by the Bullets on November 5, 2022, after averaging 9 points, 1.8 rebounds and 1.4 assists in five games.

On February 7, 2023, Walker re-signed with the Flames for the 2023 NBL1 West season.

Personal life
Walker is good friends with former teammates Jonathon Simmons and Bryce Cotton. Walker grew up idolising Detroit Pistons' great Isiah Thomas.

Walker and his wife have a daughter.

References

External links

NBL profile
Texas A&M–Commerce Lions college bio

1992 births
Living people
American expatriate basketball people in Australia
American expatriate basketball people in France
American expatriate basketball people in Italy
American expatriate basketball people in Latvia
American expatriate basketball people in New Zealand
American men's basketball players
Austin Spurs players
Basketball players from Texas
BK VEF Rīga players
Brisbane Bullets players
Chorale Roanne Basket players
Delaware 87ers players
Hawke's Bay Hawks players
Lega Basket Serie A players
New Basket Brindisi players
Northwestern Oklahoma State Rangers men's basketball players
Pallacanestro Trieste players
Shooting guards
Small forwards
South East Melbourne Phoenix players
Texas A&M–Commerce Lions men's basketball players
Westchester Knicks players